Reggie Grisham is an American horn player.

Biography
Reggie Grisham was born in Nashville, Tennessee. He completed a bachelor's degree in music education at Middle Tennessee State University and a master's degree in music performance at the University of Southern California. After completing his education, Grisham settled in the Los Angeles area. He has worked as a professional horn player for classical and popular music since 1998, playing in both ensembles and as a soloist.

Grisham has worked with artists including Kelly Clarkson, Marc Broussard, Mandisa, Casting Crowns, Michael English, Natalie Grant, and Denver and the Mile High Orchestra. In 2012-13, he toured with The Who on the Quadrophenia and More tour.

References

Musicians from Nashville, Tennessee
USC Thornton School of Music alumni
Middle Tennessee State University alumni
American classical horn players
Living people
20th-century American musicians
20th-century classical musicians
21st-century American musicians
21st-century classical musicians
Year of birth missing (living people)